was a Japanese physicist with diverse interests and effect. His given name was also written as Aikitu.

Biography
Tanakadate was born in Fukuoka hamlet, in what is now part of the city of Ninohe in the northern Iwate Prefecture, Japan. He was the son of Tanakadate Inazo, a teacher of Jitsuyo, a martial art, and his wife, Kisei.

Tanakadate studied English at Keio-Gijuku University starting in 1873, and graduated from Tokyo Imperial University in 1882 with a degree in physics. He developed a way to write Japanese in the Latin alphabet called Nihon-shiki or Nippon-shiki in 1885, later becoming president of the Japanese Romanization Society. In the lead up to the second world war, he advocated directly for Nippon-shiki over Hepburn, eventually resulting in its adoption as the official Romanization standard by the wartime government. He visited Europe many times, and from 1888 to 1890 worked with Lord Kelvin at Glasgow University in Scotland, and with others in Berlin in Germany. Whilst in Scotland he was elected a Fellow of the Royal Society of Edinburgh. His proposers were Lord Kelvin, James Thomson Bottomley, James Alfred Ewing and Magnus Maclean.

Tanakadate travelled widely in Japan from 1893 to 1896, making a survey of gravity and geomagnetism for geophysical research with Cargill Gilston Knott. He founded the Institute of Seismology at Tokyo Imperial University. The International Latitude Observatory (sometimes called the Astro-Geodynamics Observatory) at Mizusawa was founded in 1899 as he had proposed.

Tanakadate was also an early proponent of military aviation. In the Russo-Japanese War, he was an advisor to the Imperial Japanese army on the use of hot air balloons for military reconnaissance purposes. This led to the establishment of an aviation laboratory at Tokyo Imperial University. At a 1907 conference in Paris on the metric system, Tanakadate saw a model of early fixed-wing airplane, and extended his stay in Paris to study further. In his Japanese laboratory he built a wind tunnel. Tanakadate published dozens of articles on aeronautics and aviation from 1910 to 1916 in both Japanese and in French. He appears to have been the most-published Japanese aeronautical scientist of that period.  He founded a department on aviation at Tokyo University.

Tanakadate was the first Japanese member of the International Committee for Weights and Measures and helped arrange the official adoption of the metric system of weights and measures in Japan. From 1925 to 1947, he served as a member of the House of Peers of the Diet of Japan. In 1944, he was awarded the Asahi Prize.

He died in Tokyo on 21 May 1952.

Some of his papers are kept at Glasgow University.

Recognition
 1902 –  Order of the Rising Sun, 4th class 
 1906 –  Order of the Rising Sun, 2nd class 
 1916 –  Grand Cordon of the Order of the Sacred Treasure
 1944 –  Order of Culture, Member
 1952 –  Grand Cordon of the Order of the Rising Sun (posthumous)

An asteroid, 10300 Tanakadate, was named for him in 1989. A commemorative postage stamp was issued in his honor in 2002.

References

External links 
 

Japanese physicists
University of Tokyo alumni
Alumni of the University of Glasgow
Academic staff of the University of Tokyo
Members of the House of Peers (Japan)
League of Nations people
Recipients of the Legion of Honour
Recipients of the Order of Culture
Grand Cordons of the Order of the Rising Sun
Recipients of the Order of the Sacred Treasure, 1st class
People from Iwate Prefecture
1856 births
1952 deaths
Fellows of the Royal Society of Edinburgh